The Flamingo's Smile: Reflections in Natural History, published in 1985, is the fourth volume of collected essays from evolutionary biologist and well-known science writer Stephen Jay Gould; the essays were culled from his monthly column The View of Life in Natural History magazine, to which Gould contributed for more than two decades. The book deals, in typically discursive fashion, with themes familiar to Gould's writing: evolution and its teaching, science biography, probabilities and common sense.

The title essay, "The Flamingo's Smile", discusses changes in morphology arising as a consequence of behavior, as illustrated by the beak and tongue of the flamingo. Topics discussed in other essays include SETI, the extinction of the dinosaurs, the Omphalos hypothesis, and the importance of taxonomy.

References

1985 non-fiction books
American essay collections
Scientific essays
English-language books
Books about birds
Flamingos
Works originally published in Natural History (magazine)
Books by Stephen Jay Gould